Cyperus hystricinus is a species of sedge that is native to southern parts of North America.

See also 
 List of Cyperus species

References 

hystricinus
Plants described in 1906
Flora of Alabama
Flora of Arkansas
Flora of Delaware
Flora of Georgia (U.S. state)
Flora of Louisiana
Flora of Maryland
Flora of Mississippi
Flora of Missouri
Flora of Texas
Flora of New Jersey
Flora of Virginia
Flora of North Carolina
Taxa named by Merritt Lyndon Fernald
Flora without expected TNC conservation status